Manduca blackburni, the Hawaiian tomato hornworm, Hawaiian tobacco hornworm or Blackburn's sphinx moth, is a moth in the family Sphingidae. The species was first described by Arthur Gardiner Butler in 1880. It is endemic to Hawaii. Previously known from all of the main islands, this rare moth is now limited to Maui, the Big Island, and Kahoolawe.

Manduca blackburni is closely related to the tomato hornworm (M. quinquemaculata), which it also physically resembles. It was listed as an endangered species by the United States Fish and Wildlife Service in 2000, making it the first Hawaiian insect to receive such a status.

Larvae feed on plants in the nightshade family, Solanaceae, especially native aiea (Nothocestrum spp.), but also non-native tomatoes (Solanum lycopersicum), tobacco (Nicotiana tabacum), tree tobacco (N. glauca), jimson weed (Datura stramonium), and eggplant (Solanum melongena). The adult feeds on nectar from native plants such as koali awa (Ipomoea indica) and maiapilo (Capparis sandwichiana).

References

External links

Manduca
Moths described in 1880
Endemic moths of Hawaii
Endangered fauna of the United States
ESA endangered species